Jaipur–Lucknow Express is an Express train belonging to North Western Railway zone of Indian Railways that run between  and  in India.

Background
This train was inaugurated on 4 February 2014 and became the direct train running between the two-state capitals of India and also it becomes the 13th train of Jaipur and Lucknow corridor.

Service
The frequency of this train is weekly, it covers the distance of 674 km with an average speed of 50 km/hr.

Routes

Traction
As this route is partly-electrified, a WDP-4 based loco pulls the train to its destination on both sides.

External links
 19715 Jaipur – Lucknow Express
 19716 Lucknow – Jaipur Express

References

Rail transport in Rajasthan
Passenger trains originating from Lucknow
Express trains in India